Grotellaforma is a monotypic moth genus of the family Noctuidae erected by William Barnes and Foster Hendrickson Benjamin in 1922. Its only species, Grotellaforma lactea, was first described by Stretch in 1885. It is found in North America, including California and Arizona, its type locations.

References

External links

Hadeninae
Monotypic moth genera